Edor Albrekt Hjukström (8 May 1916 – 27 October 2002) was a Swedish military officer and skier. His last rank was lieutenant colonel. At the 1948 Winter Olympics he participated in the demonstration event  military patrol (precursor to biathlon). His team finished first in the military patrol event.

Biography 
Hjukström was born on 8 May 1916 in Sorsele, Sweden, the son of Gustaf Hjukström, a forester, and his wife Ida (née Abrahamsson). He was the youngest son and he had three brothers. After his primary education he was a forestry worker for three years before he joined the Västerbotten Regiment in Umeå. In 1937 he completed the NCO training at the Swedish Army Non-Commissioned Officer School in Uppsala, the Swedish Army warrant officers school, and achieved the higher education entrance qualification. In 1939 he won the army masterships, He had the rank of an ensign when he was transferred to the Dalarna Regiment in 1942, where he to part at the regiment's military patrol events in 1941, in 1942 and in 1944. In 1944 he was advanced to the rank of a lieutenant and became ski master of the Swedish Army in the following year. From 1946 to 1948 he was platoon leader at the ranger school Kiruna, and became captain in 1950, when he entered Military Academy Karlberg. From 1953 to 1955 he was General Staff candidate, became major in 1962, and was deputy battalion commander. In 1966, advanced to the rank of a lieutenant colonel, he was transferred to the Army Staff.

Other work
He was chairman of the Society for the Promotion of Ski Sport and Open Air Life (Skid- och friluftsfrämjandet) in Umeå from 1965.

Personal life
In 1954, he married Rosa Carlsson (born 1931), the daughter of master builder Carl Carlsson and Edith Carlsson. He was the father of Björn (born 1956) and Peter (born 1963).

Awards and decorations
  Knight of the Order of the Sword (1962)
  Swedish Central Federation for Voluntary Military Training Merit Badge

References

1916 births
2002 deaths
Swedish male alpine skiers
Swedish male cross-country skiers
Swedish Army colonels
Swedish military patrol (sport) runners
Military patrol competitors at the 1948 Winter Olympics
Olympic biathletes of Sweden
People from Sorsele Municipality
Knights of the Order of the Sword
20th-century Swedish people